Robert Harry (fl. 1397–1399) of Seaford, Sussex, was an English politician.

He was a Member (MP) of the Parliament of England for Seaford in January 1397 and 1399.

References

Year of birth missing
Year of death missing
English MPs September 1397
People from Seaford, East Sussex
English MPs 1399